The Progress World Championship is a professional wrestling World championship created and promoted by the British professional wrestling promotion Progress Wrestling. The current champion is Spike Trivet, who is in his first reign.

History

Unlike conventional wrestling championships which are generally represented by a Championship belt, the Progress championship was initially represented by a large staff with an eagle head piece since its creation in May 2012. At Chapter 16 on 30 November 2014, the staff was replaced by a more traditional title belt. The title has been defended in the United States at the WrestleCon Supershow in Dallas, Texas, and subsequently defended in Italy on 30 April 2016 and Ireland on 16 July 2016. On 5 May 2019, the World Championship and Atlas Championship were unified by Walter, defeating Trent Seven. The title was henceforth known as the Unified World Championship.

Vacant title tournament (2022)
Jonathan Gresham vacated the championship on 15 May 2022 due to a controversial defense. Progress Wrestling announced that the 2022 edition of the Super Strong Style 16 tournament finals from 6 June will also be for the vacant championship.

Title history
There have been a total of 19 reigns and three vacancies shared between 17 distinctive champions. Nathan Cruz was the inaugural and is also the youngest champion, winning the title at 21 years. Cara Noir had the longest reign at 791 days and 17 successful title defenses, while Mark Andrews had the shortest reign at less than a day and zero successful title defenses. Spike Trivet is the current champion in his first reign. He defeated Big Damo at PROGRESS Chapter 139: Warriors Come Out to Play on August 28, 2022, to win the title.

Combined reigns  

References

External links 
 Progress World Title History at Cagematch.net

Progress Wrestling championships
World professional wrestling championships